"It's On Again" is a song by American singer Alicia Keys featuring American rapper Kendrick Lamar. The song was written for the 2014 superhero film The Amazing Spider-Man 2 by Keys and Lamar in collaboration with Hans Zimmer, who scored the film, and producer Pharrell Williams, "It's On Again" was released on March 31, 2014 as the lead single from the film's  soundtrack.

Music video
The music video of "It's On Again" was released on April 14, 2014 on Vevo and was directed by Rich Lee. It features appearances from Alicia Keys, Kendrick Lamar, Pharrell Williams, and Hans Zimmer and footage of the film.

Release
On March 12, 2014, Columbia Records issued a press release announcing that "It's On Again" would be included on the soundtrack for The Amazing Spider-Man 2 (2014) and serve as the closing song for the film. The release included a statement from director Marc Webb, who described the process of selecting "a song that would be upbeat and exciting, but also contain a note of foreboding" to serve as the film's closing theme and praised "It's On Again" as the "perfect end note." Keys also expressed her excitement at working with Kendrick Lamar, producer Pharrell Williams and film composer Hans Zimmer, the latter of whom scores the film. On March 31, "It's On Again" was uploaded to Keys' official SoundCloud page and impacted mainstream urban radio in the United States. The following day, it was released digitally as a single.

Live performances 
The songs was performed for the first time on television on The Tonight Show with Jimmy Fallon. The song was also performed at the film's premiere concert in New York City.

Commercial performance
"It's On Again" debuted on the Billboard Adult R&B Songs and Hot R&B/Hip-Hop Airplay charts at numbers 17 and 40 respectively on the chart week ending April 19, 2014.

Track listing 
Digital download
 "It's On Again" (featuring Kendrick Lamar) – 3:49
 "It's On Again" – 3:14

Charts

Weekly charts

Year-end charts

Release history

References

2014 singles
2014 songs
Alicia Keys songs
Kendrick Lamar songs
RCA Records singles
Songs written for films
Song recordings produced by Pharrell Williams
Songs written by Alicia Keys
Songs with music by Hans Zimmer
Songs written by Kendrick Lamar
Songs written by Pharrell Williams
Songs from Spider-Man films
The Amazing Spider-Man (2012 film series)
Music videos directed by Rich Lee